The Fangyuan Lighthouse is a lighthouse in Fangyuan Township, Changhua County, Taiwan.

History
The lighthouse was built in 1983 at the eastern side of Wanggong Fishing Port to ensure the safety of vessels moving around the port.

Architecture
The octagonal lighthouse is painted in black and white vertical bands and stands up to 35.7 meters. The tower was constructed with reinforced concrete and equipped with fourth class electric lamp, which generated 28,000 candlepower light for as far as 16.6 nautical miles. It was built with a power generation room, store room and dorms.

Technical specifications
The light beam from the lighthouse is five seconds light, then five seconds dark...

See also

 List of lighthouses in Taiwan
 List of tourist attractions in Taiwan

References

External links

 Maritime and Port Bureau MOTC

Lighthouses in Taiwan
Tourist attractions in Changhua County
1983 establishments in Taiwan
Lighthouses completed in 1983